Jupiter's North Pole is the northernmost point of Jupiter. Like Jupiter's South Pole, it has a bluer surface color than the rest of Jupiter. It was first imaged in July 2016 with the Juno probe entering the polar orbit of Jupiter. At the same time, its polar cyclone was discovered, measuring just over 3000 km, surrounded by eight smaller cyclones which each measure 2400–2800 km in diameter.  They are almost half the size of the South Pole cyclones and form a close to regular eight-corner. All of them turn counterclockwise.

In contrast to the South Pole, where in 2019 to the five peripheral cyclones added a sixth, at the North Pole this structure of "1+8", at least until the end of 2020, remained stable. Its stability is provided by the tendency of peripheral cyclones to repel each other and move toward the pole, while the central cyclone tends to repel them all.

Three peripheral cyclones (the second, sixth, and eighth) are close to the background in brightness, and the other five are lighter. Several smaller cyclones up to 1000 km in diameter, some of which also rotate clockwise, circle around them.

The temperature of the upper atmosphere in this region is about -83...-13 °C

When the Juno arrived at Jupiter, its North Pole was immersed in the darkness of polar night, so its first pictures were only infrared.  Only when sunlight shifted to the Northern Hemisphere was it possible to see all its cyclones in the light of the Sun.  To make one complete picture of the pole, the apparatus requires four approaches to it.

At the North Pole of Jupiter there is a large X-ray spot, discovered in 2000, pulsating with a period of about 45 minutes (there is a similar spot at the South Pole, but it is much smaller). Explanations of this phenomenon have not yet been found.

Notes 

Jupiter